The Outer Island lighthouse is a lighthouse located on the northern tip of Outer Island, one of the Apostle Islands, in Lake Superior in Ashland County, Wisconsin, near the city of Bayfield.

The light was designed by United States Lighthouse Board Eleventh District Chief Engineer Orlando Poe and constructed under the supervision of his successor, Godfrey Weitzel.

Currently owned by the National Park Service and part of the Apostle Islands National Lakeshore, it was added to the National Register of Historic Places in 1977, part of reference number 77000145. It is listed in the Library of Congress Historic American Buildings Survey, WI-318. The lighthouse is attached to a two-story, red brick keeper's quarters.

Access
Most of the Apostle Islands light stations may be reached on the Apostle Islands Cruise Service water taxi or by private boat during the summer. During the Annual Apostle Island Lighthouse Celebration ferry tour service is available for all the lighthouses. In the tourist season, volunteer park rangers are on many of the islands to greet visitors.

Erosion control
In 2004–2005, the National Park Service undertook a significant erosion control project at Outer Island, to stabilize the bluff which had proved susceptible to erosion since the station's earliest days. The project followed a similar effort completed the previous year at the Raspberry Island Lighthouse, and consisted of a three-part strategy: armoring the cliff base with a massive stone wall; improving drainage on the upper grounds to prevent runoff from undercutting the clay bank; and stabilizing the bluff face with "bio-engineering," i.e. planting carefully selected vegetation to anchor the slope. The rock wall at the bottom and drainage system at the top were completed, but a shortage of funds required scaling back the bio-engineering plans, and only the most critical sections of the bluff face were treated.

Notable incidents
On September 2, 1905, Outer Island Keeper John Irvine performed a heroic rescue, when the 337-foot, three-masted schooner-barge Pretoria lost the line to its towing steamer Venezuela during  a fierce storm. Sixty-one-year-old keeper Irvine was alone on the island, his assistants having gone to town, but when the lifeboat flipped in the surf, he waded into the waves and rescued five of the ten men. On that same night, the steamer Sevona also sank in the Apostle Islands, striking a reef near the Sand Island Lighthouse, with the loss of seven men. This double tragedy preceded the better-known Mataafa Storm by several weeks.

See also
Apostle Islands Lighthouses

References

Further reading

 Havighurst, Walter (1943) The Long Ships Passing: The Story of the Great Lakes, Macmillan Publishers.
 Oleszewski, Wes, Great Lakes Lighthouses, American and Canadian: A Comprehensive Directory/Guide to Great Lakes Lighthouses, (Gwinn, Michigan: Avery Color Studios, Inc., 1998) .
 Olson, Elna. " Lighthouse Memories: My Life on Outer Island." The Keeper's Log (Spring 1993), pp. 20–22.
 
Taylor, Paul (October 2009) Orlando M. Poe: Civil War General and Great Lakes Engineer (Kent State University Press) ; .
 Wright, Larry and Wright, Patricia, Great Lakes Lighthouses Encyclopedia Hardback (Erin: Boston Mills Press, 2006) .

External links

Aerial photos of Outer Island Light, Marina.com.
Library of Congress Historic American Buildings Survey Survey number HABS WI-318
Lighthouse friends, Outer Island, WI article.
Merket, Jim, Outer Island: Place of Remoteness and Beauty, Lighthouse Digest, Oct. 1999.
National Park Service Maritime History Project, Inventory of Historic Light Stations - Wisconsin, Outer Island Light.
Terry Pepper, Seeing the Light, Outer Island Light.

Wobser, David, Outer Island Light, Boatnerd

Lighthouses completed in 1874
Houses completed in 1874
Apostle Islands National Lakeshore
Lighthouses in Ashland County, Wisconsin
Lighthouses on the National Register of Historic Places in Wisconsin
National Register of Historic Places in Ashland County, Wisconsin